Rose Hamilton Moutray Read  (1870–1947) was a British author and horticulturist.

Life and family 
Rose Hamilton Moutray Read was born in 1870, the eldest child of Edith and John Moutray Read, who was a Lt Colonel of the 4th Cheshire Regiment. Her youngest brother was Anketell Moutray Read, who earned a Victoria Cross during the First World War.

Work 
Under the pseudonym DH Moutray Read, she wrote the popular "Highways and Byways of Hampshire" volume in the Highways & Byways series, in this instance illustrated by portrait painter Arthur Bentley Connor. Moutray Read also wrote a book on the creation of her own garden, with illustrations, plans and photographs. She began gardening with a ten rod allotment in Cottenham Park, Wimbledon, and soon realised that she could not manage without a garden. She purchased an old house and garden of about three quarters of an acre near Wadhurst in Sussex, which was grassland when Moutray Read purchased it.

Moutray Read was a Fellow of the Royal Horticultural Society, and edited the Gardener's Year Book for 1930. Moutray Read was also a member of the Folklore Society, presenting a number of papers, and reviewing books for the society's journal Folklore.

Publications

References 

British horticulturists
20th-century British women writers
British nature writers
Fellows of the Royal Horticultural Society
1870 births
1947 deaths